Sweetgreen (legally Sweetgreen, Inc., stylized as sweetgreen, previously swɘetgreen) is an American fast casual restaurant chain that serves salads. It was founded in November 2006 by Nicolas Jammet, Nathaniel Ru, and Jonathan Neman. In August 2007, they opened their first store in Washington, D.C., three months after they graduated from the McDonough School of Business at Georgetown University.

Sweetgreen's corporate headquarters moved to the Los Angeles area from Washington, D.C. in 2016. , it had 158 stores in operation in thirteen states, including California, Colorado, Connecticut, Illinois, Georgia, Massachusetts, Michigan, New Jersey, New York, Maryland, Pennsylvania, Virginia, Texas, Florida and the District of Columbia, with a location opening soon in Indiana. The company has over 4,000 employees.

Customers can order in-store or through their app for pickup, delivery and outpost as well as use their app to pay for in-store ordering. They are also in various marketplaces.

In November 2018, Sweetgreen had raised  in funding. Sweetgreen was named one of the Most Innovative Companies in 2019 and 2020, and won the 2020 Webby Award for Food & Drink in the Apps, Mobile & Voice category.

History
Sweetgreen was founded in 2006 by Nicolas Jammet, Nathaniel Ru, and Jonathan Neman, all Georgetown University students at the time. The trio were disappointed with campus food options.

Sweetgreen raised its initial $375,000 of startup funding from investors including the three founders' parents, Joe Bastianich, Seth Goldman, and Washington's Latino Economic Development Center. In 2013, it accepted a $22 million investment from Revolution Growth, a venture capital fund founded by Steve Case. In 2014, it received $18.5 million in investment from Revolution Growth. In 2015, it raised an additional $35 million in investment under the lead of T. Rowe Price with contributions from existing investor Revolution Growth. The company has raised over $95 million to date.

In 2018 the startup raised a $200 million Series H round led by Fidelity that valued the company at more than $1 billion, and bringing Sweetgreen's total amount of funding to $365 million.
In the fall of 2019, Sweetgreen raised an additional $150 million Series I round led by Lone Pine Capital and D1 Capital Partners, bringing the company's total valuation to $1.6 billion.

In July 2021, Axios reported that Sweetgreen had filed confidentially for an IPO.  It became a public company on 18 November 2021 traded under the New York Stock Exchange symbol SG.

In August 2021, Sweetgreen announced its plans to acquire Massachusetts Institute of Technology startup, Spyce, a Boston-based restaurant that uses service robots to prepare meals.

In August 2022, Sweetgreen opened a location in Birmingham, Michigan, their first in Michigan, with plans to expand to Troy and Ann Arbor later in 2022.

Menu and digital app
Sweetgreen serves a variety of salads and warm bowls. Their seasonal menu rotates 5 times a year, based on produce availability and location.

The restaurant launched a mobile app in 2015. In May 2020, the brand added order status tracking and push notifications in real time, allowing the customers to know when their order is received or ready following restrictions from the COVID-19 pandemic. In January 2020, Sweetgreen launched its own delivery service within their app.

Social actions
Sweetgreen has partnered with local chefs and restaurants on time-limited menu items, often when opening locations in a new city. These collaborations have included chef duo Jon and Vinny in Los Angeles, Nancy Silverton, Michael Solomonov in Philadelphia area, Danny Bowein in New York, Ken Oringer in Boston, and Chris Shepherd in Houston.

Sweetgreen has collaborated multiple times with David Chang of Momofuku, including a new salad dressing that was featured in the New York locations during the summer of 2014. In February 2020, Sweetgreen again partnered with David Chang to launch the Tingly Sweet Potato and Kelp Bowl. The collaboration brought attention to ocean acidification and its effects on marine life through the use of sustainable kelp.

In 2015, in the lead up to the Sweetlife music festival, Sweetgreen collaborated with musician Kendrick Lamar leading up to his second appearance at the Sweetlife music festival. The salad, named "Beets Don't Kale My Vibe," was a pun playing off one of Lamar's most well known lyrics. The collaboration resulted in over 100 articles featuring the salad, and 10% of proceeds from the salad went to FoodCorps to connect kids to real food.

In 2018, Sweetgreen partnered with Hank's Mini Market, a family-owned corner store in L.A.’s Hyde Park neighborhood, a known food desert, to help bring healthier options to its customers as part of their work to expand food access.

In 2019, Sweetgreen partnered with FoodCorps again, committing $1 million over the next two years to support FoodCorps's endeavours.

During the onset of the COVID-19 crisis, Sweetgreen announced the launch of the Sweetgreen Impact Outpost Fund in partnership with World Central Kitchen to deliver free meals to hospital workers on the frontlines. In 2020, the company served more than 400,000 meals to over 400 hospitals nationwide.

Sweetgreen made it easier for employees to vote in the 2020 election by providing up to 3 hours of paid time off for all hourly employees to either vote early or vote on election day. The chain also created a registration portal and QR code in partnership with When We All Vote, making it easier for team members to register.

In May 2021, Sweetgreen announced their first-ever national athlete ambassador, tennis player Naomi Osaka. Osaka announced a new menu item supporting The Asian American Foundation.

Sweetlife Festival

Between 2011 and 2016, Sweetgreen hosted an annual music and food festival at the Merriweather Post Pavilion in Columbia, Maryland.

Headliners
 2016: The 1975, Halsey, Flume
 2015: Kendrick Lamar, Calvin Harris, The Weeknd
 2014: Lana Del Rey, Foster the People
 2013: Phoenix, Passion Pit, Kendrick Lamar, Yeah Yeah Yeahs
 2012: Avicii, Kid Cudi, The Shins
 2011: The Strokes, Girl Talk, Lupe Fiasco

References

External links 
 

Restaurant chains in the United States
Companies based in Culver City, California
Restaurants established in 2007
2007 establishments in Washington, D.C.
Fast casual restaurants
2021 initial public offerings
Companies listed on the New York Stock Exchange